Jacksoniana is a monotypic moth genus in the subfamily Lymantriinae described by Nye in 1980. Its only species, Jacksoniana striata, was first described by Cyril Leslie Collenette in 1937.

References

Lymantriinae
Noctuoidea genera
Monotypic moth genera